Krtovce is a municipality in the Topoľčany District of the Nitra Region, Slovakia. In 2011 it had 303 inhabitants.

OFK Krtovce, local football team, is playing the sixth tier football league of Slovakia.

References

External links
Krtovce 
Population

Villages and municipalities in Topoľčany District